Birr may refer to:

Places
 Birr, County Offaly, a town in Ireland
 Birr Castle, a castle in Birr, Ireland
 Birr (UK Parliament constituency), a UK parliamentary constituency in what is now County Offaly, 1885–1918
 Birr, Ontario, a community in Middlesex Centre, Ontario, Canada
 Birr, Switzerland, a municipality in Aargau, Switzerland

People
 Jim Birr (1916–2006), American professional basketball player
 Kevin Birr (born 1969), American curler
 Todd Birr (born 1968), American curler

Other
 Ethiopian birr, the currency of Ethiopia
 Birr RFC, a rugby club in the Irish town
 Synod of Birr, in the Irish town, in 697
 Birr Aerodrome, near the Irish town

See also
 Bier (disambiguation)
 Burr (disambiguation)